Emulsified Fuels are emulsions composed of water and a combustible liquid, either oil or a fuel. Emulsions are a particular example of a dispersion comprising a continuous and a dispersed phase. The most commonly used emulsion fuel is water-in-diesel emulsion. In the case of emulsions, both phases are the immiscible liquids, oil and water. Emulsion fuels can be either a microemulsion or an ordinary emulsion (sometimes referred to as macroemulsion, to differentiate it from microemulsion).  The essential differences between the two are stability (microemulsions are thermodynamically stable systems, whereas macroemulsions are kinetically stabilized) and particle size distribution (microemulsions are formed spontaneously and have dimensions of 10 to 200 nm, whereas macroemulsions are formed by a shearing process and have dimensions of 100 nm to over 1 micrometer). Microemulsions are isotropic whereas macroemulsions are prone to settling (or creaming) and changes in particle size over time. Both use surfactants (also called emulsifiers) and can be either water-in-oil (invert emulsions), or oil-in-water (regular emulsions) or bicontinuous (also called multiple or complex emulsions).

Applications
Water continuous (oil-in-water) emulsified fuels are exemplified by the Orimulsion system and bitumen emulsions. These are often described as a high internal phase emulsion (HIPE) because the continuous phase is around 30% of the composition of the fuel, whereas it is more usual for the dispersed phase to be the minor component. Water continuous emulsions of very heavy crudes, bitumen are easier to pump than the original fuel, which would require considerable heating and / or dilution with a distilled product (kerosene or light crude) in order to make them easy to handle. Water continuous emulsions of residual fuel, heavy fuel oils etc. which have a calorific value and are used in industrial applications can also be converted to emulsified fuels, thus reducing the need to use cutter fluids and improving the combustion emissions associated with the inferior fuels.

Oil continuous (water-in-oil) emulsified fuels are exemplified by diesel (or biodiesel blended fuels) and water emulsions. These emulsified fuels were recognized in Europe (France and Italy) and CEN workshop standard was established (CWA 15145:2004). Other types of fuels have been emulsified contain between 5 and 30% water (by mass) in the overall fuel emulsion. Water-in-diesel fuel emulsion could be used as an alternative fuel for low emissions and high brake thermal efficiency.
 
Emulsion to combustion (E2C}or on demand water in fuel emulsions for HFO and Diesel for shipping and stationary boilers are available from Nonox Ltd. since 2006. The advantage of mixing on demand is no chemical surfactants are required, water/fuel ratio can be adjusted to load for maximum efficiency and no chance of separation in storage. This proven system reduces soot emissions up to 90%, NOx 40% and offers fuel savings which vary depending on the baseline efficiency of the load. 

Microemulsions of fuels have also been prepared. The type of surfactants and quantities required to make these emulsion fuels sets them apart from other commercial emulsion fuels. These are considered where safety issues (e.g. fire prevention;) or commercial return justify the extra costs (e.g. enhance oil recovery, surfactant flooding;).

Theory
The main advantages to using emulsified fuels instead of the fuel itself are environmental and economic benefits. Addition of water to the diesel process decreases combustion temperatures and lowers NOx emissions. A paper compares water injection and emulsified fuels into diesel engines (marine and stationary engines) and discusses the emissions and mechanisms involved. It concludes that emulsified fuels are singularly effective in simultaneously reducing NOx and PM emissions. Another paper has examined the effects of EGR and Emulsion Fuels.

See also 

Emulsions
Emulsion dispersion
Microemulsion
Miniemulsion
Pickering emulsion
Water-in-water emulsion

References

 'Experimental investigation of a Diesel engine power, torque and noise emission using Water-Diesel emulsions', Mohammad Reza Seifi et al. http://doi.org/10.1016/j.fuel.2015.10.122

External links
 

Colloidal chemistry
Chemical mixtures
Fuels